The 1972–73 Providence Friars men's basketball team represented Providence College in the 1972–73 NCAA Division I men's basketball season. The Friars, led by fourth-year head coach Dave Gavitt, played their home games at the Providence Civic Center. They finished the season 27–4. They received an at-large bid to the NCAA tournament where they defeated Saint Joseph's in the East Region first round to advance to the East Regional semifinals where they defeated Penn advanced to the East Regional finals where they defeated Maryland to advance to the Final Four for the first time in school history, where they lost to Memphis State in the national semifinals and lost to Indiana in the National Third Place game.

Roster

Schedule

References

Providence Friars men's basketball seasons
Providence
NCAA Division I men's basketball tournament Final Four seasons
Providence
1972 in sports in Rhode Island
1973 in sports in Rhode Island